Allocreadiidae is a family of flatworms belonging to the order Plagiorchiida.

Genera

The family includes about 40 genera, including:
 Acanthocreadium Mikailov, 1969
 Acrolichanus Ward, 1917
 Allocreadium Looss, 1900
 Creptotrema Travassos, Artigas & Pereira, 1928

References

Platyhelminthes